Division 1 Västra (literally, "Division 1 Western") was a short-lived league of the third level, Division 1, in the league system of Swedish football. It comprised 8 Swedish football teams and had status as one of four official second-level leagues in 1991 and 1992.

History
Division 1 Västra was created in 1991, when large parts of the league system was changed, as one of the four second highest level leagues, comprising only 8 teams each. Division 1 Västra was in existence for two seasons only, before the league system was changed again for the 1993 season.

Previous winners

League champions

Defunct football competitions in Sweden